The tilde  or , is a grapheme with several uses. The name of the character came into English from Spanish, which in turn came from the Latin titulus, meaning "title" or "superscription". Its primary use is as a diacritic (accent) in combination with a base letter; but for historical reasons, it is also used in standalone form within a variety of contexts.

History

Use by medieval scribes

The tilde was originally written over an omitted letter or several letters as a scribal abbreviation, or "mark of suspension" and "mark of contraction", shown as a straight line when used with capitals. Thus, the commonly used words Anno Domini were frequently abbreviated to Ao Dñi, with an elevated terminal with a suspension mark placed over the "n". Such a mark could denote the omission of one letter or several letters. This saved on the expense of the scribe's labor and the cost of vellum and ink. Medieval European charters written in Latin are largely made up of such abbreviated words with suspension marks and other abbreviations; only uncommon words were given in full.

The text of the Domesday Book of 1086, relating for example, to the manor of Molland in Devon (see adjacent picture), is highly abbreviated as indicated by numerous tildes.

The text with abbreviations expanded is as follows:

Role of mechanical typewriters

On typewriters designed for languages that routinely use diacritics (accent marks), there are two possible solutions. Keys can be dedicated to precomposed characters or alternatively a dead key mechanism can be provided. With the latter, a mark is made when a dead key is typed, but unlike normal keys, the paper carriage does not move on and thus the next letter to be typed is printed under that accent. Typewriters for Spanish typically have a dedicated key for Ñ/ñ but, as Portuguese uses Ã/ã and Õ/õ, a single dead-key (rather than take two keys to dedicate) is the most practical solution.

The tilde symbol did not exist independently as a movable type or hot-lead printing character since the type cases for Spanish or Portuguese would include sorts for the accented forms.

The centralized ASCII tilde

The first ASCII standard (X3.64-1963) did not have a tilde. Like Portuguese and Spanish, the French, German and Scandinavian languages also needed symbols in excess of the basic 26 needed for English. The ASA worked with and through the CCITT to internationalize the code-set, to meet the basic needs of at least the Western European languages.

Thus ISO646 was born (and the ASCII standard updated to X3.64-1967), providing the tilde and other symbols as optional characters.

ISO646 and ASCII incorporated many of the overprinting lower-case diacritics from typewriters, including tilde. Overprinting was intended to work by putting a backspace code between the codes for letter and diacritic. However even at that time, mechanisms that could do this or any other overprinting were not widely available, did not work for capital letters, and were impossible on video displays, with the result that this concept failed to gain significant acceptance. Consequently, many of these free-standing diacritics (and the underscore) were quickly reused by software as additional syntax, basically becoming new types of syntactic symbols that a programming language could use. As this usage became predominant, type design gradually evolved so these diacritic characters became larger and more vertically centered, making them useless as overprinted diacritics but much easier to read as free-standing characters that had come to be used for entirely different and novel purposes. Most modern fonts align the plain ASCII "spacing" (free-standing) tilde at the same level as dashes, or only slightly higher.

The free-standing tilde is at code 126 in ASCII, where it was inherited into Unicode as U+007E.

A similar shaped mark is known in typography and lexicography as a swung dash: these are used in dictionaries to indicate the omission of the entry word.

Connection to Spanish

As indicated by the etymological origin of the word "tilde" in English, this symbol has been closely associated with the Spanish language. The connection stems from the use of the tilde above the letter  to form the (different) letter  in Spanish, a feature shared by only a few other languages, most of which are historically connected to Spanish. This peculiarity can help non-native speakers quickly identify a text as being written in Spanish with little chance of error. In addition, most native speakers, although not all, use the word  to refer to their language. Particularly during the 1990s, Spanish-speaking intellectuals and news outlets demonstrated support for the language and the culture by defending this letter against globalisation and computerisation trends that threatened to remove it from keyboards and other standardised products and codes. The Instituto Cervantes, founded by Spain's government to promote the Spanish language internationally, chose as its logo a highly stylised  with a large tilde. The 24-hour news channel CNN in the US later adopted a similar strategy on its existing logo for the launch of its Spanish-language version. And similarly to the National Basketball Association (NBA), the Spain men's national basketball team is nicknamed "ÑBA".

In Spanish itself the word  is used more generally for diacritics, including the stress-marking acute accent.

Usage

Letters with tilde 
This is a table of precomposed letters with tilde: 

A tilde diacritic can be added to almost any character by using a combining tilde.

Common use in English
The English language does not use the tilde as a diacritic, though it is used in some loanwords. The standalone form of the symbol is used more widely. Informally, it means "approximately", "about", or "around", such as "~30 minutes before", meaning "approximately 30 minutes before". Another approximation symbol is the double tilde , meaning "approximately/almost equal to". The tilde is also used to indicate congruence of shapes by placing it over an  symbol, thus .

In more recent digital usage, tildes on either side of a word or phrase have sometimes come to convey a particular tone that "let[s] the enclosed words perform both sincerity and irony", which can pre-emptively defuse a negative reaction. For example, BuzzFeed journalist Joseph Bernstein interprets the tildes in the following tweet:
"in the ~ spirit of the season ~ will now link to some of the (imho) #Bestof2014 sports reads. if you hate nice things, mute that hashtag."
as a way of making it clear that both the author and reader are aware that the enclosed phrase – "spirit of the season" – "is cliche and we know this quality is beneath our author, and we don't want you to think our author is a cliche person generally".

The symbol is used in social media to indicate sarcasm.

Diacritical use
In some languages, the tilde is a diacritic mark placed over a letter to indicate a change in its pronunciation:

Pitch
The tilde was firstly used in the polytonic orthography of Ancient Greek, as a variant of the circumflex, representing a rise in pitch followed by a return to standard pitch.

Abbreviation

Later, it was used to make abbreviations in medieval Latin documents. It was also used in Portuguese and Spanish.

The tilde was also used occasionally to make other abbreviations, such as over the letter , making , to signify the word que ("that").

Nasalization
It is also as a small  that the tilde originated when written above other letters, marking a Latin  which had been elided in old Galician-Portuguese. In modern Portuguese it indicates nasalization of the base vowel:  "hand", from Lat. manu-;  "reasons", from Lat. . This usage has been adopted in the orthographies of several native languages of South America, such as Guarani and Nheengatu, as well as in the International Phonetic Alphabet (IPA) and many other phonetic alphabets. For example,  is the IPA transcription of the pronunciation of the French place-name Lyon.

In Breton, the symbol  after a vowel means that the letter  serves only to give the vowel a nasalised pronunciation, without being itself pronounced, as it normally is. For example,  gives the pronunciation  whereas  gives .

In the DMG romanization of Tunisian Arabic, the tilde is used for nasal vowels õ and ṏ.

Palatal n

The tilded  developed from the digraph  in Spanish. Current languages in which the tilded  is used for the palatal nasal consonant  include

 Asturian
 Aymara
 Basque
 Chamorro
 Filipino
 Galician
 Guaraní
 Iñupiaq
 Mapudungun
 Papiamento
 Quechua
 Spanish
 Tetum
 Wolof

Tone
In Vietnamese, a tilde over a vowel represents a creaky rising tone (ngã). Letters with the tilde are not considered separate letters of the Vietnamese alphabet.

International Phonetic Alphabet
In phonetics, a tilde is used as a diacritic that is placed above a letter, below it or superimposed onto the middle of it:

 A tilde above a letter indicates nasalization, e.g. .
 A tilde superimposed onto the middle of a letter indicates velarization or pharyngealization, e.g. . If no precomposed Unicode character exists, the Unicode character  can be used to generate one.
 A tilde below a letter indicates laryngealisation, e.g. . If no precomposed Unicode character exists, the Unicode character  can be used to generate one.

Letter extension
In Estonian, the symbol  stands for the close-mid back unrounded vowel, and it is considered an independent letter.

Other uses
Some languages and alphabets use the tilde for other purposes, such as:
 Arabic script: A symbol resembling the tilde is used over the letter  to become , denoting a long  sound.
 Guaraní: The tilded  (note that  with tilde is not available as a precomposed glyph in Unicode) stands for the velar nasal consonant. Also, the tilded  stands for the nasalized upper central rounded vowel . Munduruku, Parintintín, and two older spellings of Filipino words also use . 
 Syriac script: A tilde (~) under the letter Kaph represents a  sound, transliterated as ch or č.
 Estonian and Võro use the tilde above the letter o (õ) to indicate the vowel , a rare sound among languages.
 Unicode has a combining vertical tilde character: . It is used to indicate middle tone in linguistic transcription of certain dialects of the Lithuanian language.

Punctuation
The tilde is used in various ways in punctuation, such as:

Range
In some languages (though not generally in English), a tilde-like wavy dash may be used as punctuation (instead of an unspaced hyphen, en dash or em dash) between two numbers, to indicate a range rather than subtraction or a hyphenated number (such as a part number or model number). For example, "12~15" means "12 to 15", "~3" means "up to three", and "100~" means "100 and greater". East Asian languages almost always use this convention, but it is often done for clarity in some other languages as well. Chinese uses the wavy dash and full-width em dash interchangeably for this purpose. In English, the tilde is often used to express ranges and model numbers in electronics, but rarely in formal grammar or in type-set documents, as a wavy dash preceding a number sometimes represents an approximation (see below).

Approximation 

Before a number the tilde can mean 'approximately'; '~42' means 'approximately 42'. When used with currency symbols that precede the number (national conventions differ), the tilde precedes the symbol, thus for example '~$10' means 'about ten dollars'.

The symbols ≈ (almost equal to) and ≅ (approximately equal to) are among the other symbols used to express approximation.

Japanese

The  is used for various purposes in Japanese, including to denote ranges of numbers (e.g., 
5〜10 means between 5 and 10) in place of dashes or brackets, and to indicate origin. The wave dash is also used to separate a title and a subtitle in the same line, as a colon is used in English.

When used in conversations via email or instant messenger it may be used as a sarcasm mark.

Unicode and Shift JIS encoding of wave dash
 

This decision avoided a shape definition error in the original (6.2) Unicode code charts: the wave dash reference glyph in JIS / Shift JIS matches the Unicode reference glyph for U+FF5E , while the original reference glyph for U+301C was reflected, incorrectly, when Unicode imported the JIS wave dash. In other platforms such as the classic Mac OS and macOS, 0x8160 is correctly mapped to U+301C. It is generally difficult, if not impossible, for users of Japanese Windows to type U+301C, especially in legacy, non-Unicode applications.

Microsoft also uses U+FF5E to map the KS X 1001 raised tilde (0xA2A6), while Apple uses .

The current Unicode reference glyph for U+301C has been corrected to match the JIS standard in response to a 2014 proposal, which noted that while the existing Unicode reference glyph had been matched by fonts from the discontinued Windows XP, all other major platforms including later versions of Microsoft Windows shipped with fonts matching the JIS reference glyph for U+301C.

The JIS / Shift JIS wave dash is still formally mapped to U+301C as of JIS X 0213, whereas the WHATWG Encoding Standard used by HTML5 follows Microsoft in mapping 0x8160 to U+FF5E. These two code points have a similar or identical glyph in several fonts, reducing the confusion and incompatibility.

Mathematics

As a unary operator

A tilde in front of a single quantity can mean "approximately", "about" or "of the same order of magnitude as."

In written mathematical logic, the tilde represents negation: "~p" means "not p", where "p" is a proposition. Modern use often replaces the tilde with the negation symbol (¬) for this purpose, to avoid confusion with equivalence relations.

As a relational operator

In mathematics, the tilde operator (Unicode U+223C), sometimes called "twiddle", is often used to denote an equivalence relation between two objects. Thus "" means " is equivalent to ". It is a weaker statement than stating that  equals . The expression "" is sometimes read aloud as " twiddles ", perhaps as an analogue to the verbal expression of "".

The tilde can indicate approximate equality in a variety of ways. It can be used to denote the asymptotic equality of two functions. For example,  means that .

A tilde is also used to indicate "approximately equal to" (e.g. 1.902 ~= 2). This usage probably developed as a typed alternative to the libra symbol used for the same purpose in written mathematics, which is an equal sign with the upper bar replaced by a bar with an upward hump, bump, or loop in the middle (︍︍♎︎) or, sometimes, a tilde (≃). The symbol "≈" is also used for this purpose.

In physics and astronomy, a tilde can be used between two expressions (e.g. ) to state that the two are of the same order of magnitude.

In statistics and probability theory, the tilde means "is distributed as"; see random variable(e.g. X ~ B(n,p) for a binomial distribution).

A tilde can also be used to represent geometric similarity (e.g. , meaning triangle  is similar to ). A triple tilde (≋) is often used to show congruence, an equivalence relation in geometry.

In graph theory, the tilde can be used to represent adjacency between vertices.

As a diacritic

The symbol "" is pronounced as "eff tilde" or, informally, as "eff twiddle". This can be used to denote the Fourier transform of f, or a lift of f, and can have a variety of other meanings depending on the context.

A tilde placed below a letter in mathematics can represent a vector quantity (e.g. ).

In statistics and probability theory, a tilde placed on top of a variable is sometimes used to represent the median of that variable; thus  would indicate the median of the variable . A tilde over the letter n is sometimes used to indicate the harmonic mean.

In machine learning, a tilde may represent a candidate value for a cell state in GRUs or LSTM units. (e.g. c̃)

Physics
Often in physics, one can consider an equilibrium solution to an equation, and then a perturbation to that equilibrium.

A tilde is also used in particle physics to denote the hypothetical supersymmetric partner. For example, an electron is referred to by the letter e, and its superpartner the selectron is written ẽ.

In multibody mechanics, the tilde operator maps three-dimensional vectors  to skew-symmetrical matrices  (see  or ).

Economics
For relations involving preference, economists sometimes use the tilde to represent indifference between two or more bundles of goods. For example, to say that a consumer is indifferent between bundles x and y, an economist would write x ~ y.

Electronics
It can approximate the sine wave symbol (∿, U+223F), which is used in electronics to indicate alternating current, in place of +, −, or ⎓ for direct current.

Linguistics

The tilde may represent some sort of phonetic or phonemic variation between two sounds, which might be allophones or in free variation. For example,  can represent "either  or ".

In formal semantics, it is also used as a notation for the squiggle operator which plays a key role in many theories of focus.

Computing

Computer programmers use the tilde in various ways and sometimes call the symbol (as opposed to the diacritic) a squiggle, squiggly, swiggle, or twiddle. According to the Jargon File, other synonyms sometimes used in programming include not, approx, wiggle, enyay (after eñe) and (humorously) sqiggle .

Directories and URLs 
On Unix-like operating systems (including AIX, BSD, Linux and macOS), tilde normally indicates the current user's home directory. This convention derives from the Lear-Siegler ADM-3A terminal in common use during the 1970s, which happened to have the tilde symbol and the word "Home" (for moving the cursor to the upper left) on the same key. When prepended to a particular username, the tilde indicates that user's home directory (e.g.,  for the home directory of user , such as ).

Used in URLs on the World Wide Web, it often denotes a personal website on a Unix-based server. For example,  might be the personal website of John Doe. This mimics the Unix shell usage of the tilde.

In URLs, the characters  (or ) may substitute for a tilde if an input device lacks a tilde key. Thus,  and  will behave in the same manner.

Computer languages 
The tilde is used in the AWK programming language as part of the pattern match operators for regular expressions:
variable ~ /regex/ returns true if the variable is matched.
variable !~ /regex/ returns false if the variable is matched.

A variant of this, with the plain tilde replaced with =~, was adopted in Perl, and this semi-standardization has led to the use of these operators in other programming languages, such as Ruby or the SQL variant of the database PostgreSQL.

In APL and MATLAB, tilde represents the monadic logical function NOT, and in APL it additionally represents the dyadic multiset function without (set difference).

In C the tilde character is used as bitwise NOT unary operator, following the notation in logic (an ! causes a logical NOT, instead). This is also used by most languages based on or influenced by C, such as C++, D and C#. The MySQL database also use tilde as bitwise invert as does Microsoft's SQL Server Transact-SQL (T-SQL) language. JavaScript also uses tilde as bitwise NOT, and because JavaScript internally uses floats and the bitwise complement only works on integers, numbers are stripped of their decimal part before applying the operation. This has also given rise to using two tildes ~~x as a short syntax for a cast to integer (numbers are stripped of their decimal part and changed into their complement, and then back).

In C++ and C#, the tilde is also used as the first character in a class's method name (where the rest of the name must be the same name as the class) to indicate a destructor – a special method which is called at the end of the object's life.

In ASP.NET application tilde ('~') is used as a shortcut to the root of the application's virtual directory.

In the CSS stylesheet language, the tilde is used for the indirect adjacent combinator as part of a selector.

In the D programming language, the tilde is used as an array concatenation operator, as well as to indicate an object destructor and bitwise not operator. Tilde operator can be overloaded for user types, and binary tilde operator is mostly used to merging two objects, or adding some objects to set of objects. It was introduced because plus operator can have different meaning in many situations. For example, what to do with "120" + "14" ? Is this a string "134" (addition of two numbers), or "12014" (concatenation of strings) or something else? D disallows + operator for arrays (and strings), and provides separate operator for concatenation (similarly PHP programming language solved this problem by using dot operator for concatenation, and + for number addition, which will also work on strings containing numbers).

In Eiffel, the tilde is used for object comparison. If a and b denote objects, the boolean expression a ~ b has value true if and only if these objects are equal, as defined by the applicable version of the library routine is_equal, which by default denotes field-by-field object equality but can be redefined in any class to support a specific notion of equality. If a and b are references, the object equality expression a ~ b is to be contrasted with a = b which denotes reference equality. Unlike the call a.is_equal (b), the expression a ~ b is type-safe even in the presence of covariance.

In the Apache Groovy programming language the tilde character is used as an operator mapped to the bitwiseNegate() method. Given a String the method will produce a java.util.regex.Pattern. Given an integer it will negate the integer bitwise like in C. =~ and ==~ can in Groovy be used to match a regular expression.

In Haskell, the tilde is used in type constraints to indicate type equality. Also, in pattern-matching, the tilde is used to indicate a lazy pattern match.

In the Inform programming language, the tilde is used to indicate a quotation mark inside a quoted string. 

In "text mode" of the LaTeX typesetting language a tilde diacritic can be obtained using, e.g., \~{n}, yielding "ñ". A stand-alone tilde can be obtained by using \textasciitilde or \string~.
In "math mode" a tilde diacritic can be written as, e.g., \tilde{x}. For a wider tilde \widetilde can be used. The \sim command produce a tilde-like binary relation symbol that is often used in mathematical expressions, and the double-tilde ≈ is obtained with \approx. The url package also supports entering tildes directly, e.g., \url{http://server/~name}.
In both text and math mode, a tilde on its own (~) renders a white space with no line breaking.

In MediaWiki syntax, four tildes are used as a shortcut for a user's signature.

In Common Lisp, the tilde is used as the prefix for format specifiers in format strings.

In Max/MSP, a tilde is used to denote objects that process at the computer's sampling rate, i.e. mainly those that deal with sound.

In Standard ML, the tilde is used as the prefix for negative numbers and as the unary negation operator.

In OCaml, the tilde is used to specify the label for a labeled parameter.

In R, the tilde operator is used to separate the left- and right-hand sides in a model formula.

In Object REXX, the twiddle is used as a "message send" symbol. For example, Employee.name~lower() would cause the lower() method to act on the object Employee's name attribute, returning the result of the operation. ~~ returns the object that received the method rather than the result produced. Thus it can be used when the result need not be returned or when cascading methods are to be used. team~~insert("Jane")~~insert("Joe")~~insert("Steve") would send multiple concurrent insert messages, thus invoking the insert method three consecutive times on the team object.

my $concatResult = "Hello " ~ "world!";
$concatResult ~~ /<|w><[A..Z]><[a..z]>*<|w>/;

print "$/\n"; # outputs "Hello"
# the $/ variable holds the last regex match result

Keyboards
The presence (or absence) of a tilde engraved on the keyboard depends on the territory where it was sold. In either case, computer's system settings determine the keyboard mapping and the default setting will match the engravings on the keys. Even so, it certainly possible to configure a keyboard for a different locale than that supplied by the retailer. On American and British keyboards, the tilde is a standard keytop and pressing it produces a free-standing "ASCII Tilde". To generate a letter with a tilde diacritic requires the US international or UK extended keyboard setting. 
 With US-international, the `/~ key is a dead key: pressing the  key then a letter produces the tilde-accented form of that letter. (For example,  produces .) With this setting active, an ASCII tilde can be inserted with the dead key followed by the space bar, or alternatively by striking the dead key twice in a row.
 With UK-extended, the key works normally but becomes a 'dead key' when combined with AltGr. Thus  then a letter produces the accented form of that letter.
 With a Mac either of the Alt/Option keys function similarly.
 With Linux, the compose key facility is used.
Instructions for other national languages and keyboards are beyond the scope of this article.

In the US and European Windows systems, the Alt code for a single tilde is 126.

Backup filenames 
The dominant Unix convention for naming backup copies of files is appending a tilde to the original file name.
It originated with the Emacs text editor and was adopted by many other editors and some command-line tools.

Emacs also introduced an elaborate numbered backup scheme, with files named ,  and so on. It didn't catch on, as the rise of version control software eliminates the need for this usage.

Microsoft filenames 
The tilde was part of Microsoft's filename mangling scheme when it extended the FAT file system standard to support long filenames for Microsoft Windows. Programs written prior to this development could only access filenames in the so-called 8.3 format—the filenames consisted of a maximum of eight characters from a restricted character set (e.g. no spaces), followed by a period, followed by three more characters. In order to permit these legacy programs to access files in the FAT file system, each file had to be given two names—one long, more descriptive one, and one that conformed to the 8.3 format. This was accomplished with a name-mangling scheme in which the first six characters of the filename are followed by a tilde and a digit. For example, "" might become "".

The tilde symbol is also often used to prefix hidden temporary files that are created when a document is opened in Windows. For example, when a document "Document1.doc" is opened in Word, a file called "~$cument1.doc" is created in the same directory. This file contains information about which user has the file open, to prevent multiple users from attempting to change a document at the same time.

Juggling notation
In the juggling notation system Beatmap, tilde can be added to either "hand" in a pair of fields to say "cross the arms with this hand on top". Mills Mess is thus represented as (~2x,1)(1,2x)(2x,~1)*.

Unicode

Variants and similars
Unicode has code-points for many forms of non-combined tilde, for symbols incorporating tildes, and for characters visually similar to a tilde.

Precomposed characters
A number of characters in Unicode, have tilde precomposed.

See also 
 Circumflex
 Caret (computing)
 Tittle
 Double tilde (disambiguation)

Notes

References 

Latin-script diacritics
Punctuation
Typographical symbols
Greek-script diacritics
Logic symbols
Mathematical symbols